German submarine U-857 was a Type IXC/40 U-boat of Nazi Germany's Kriegsmarine built for service during the Second World War. She was ordered on 5 June 1941, laid down on 16 November 1942, and launched on 25 May 1943. For her operational lifespan, she was commanded by Kapitänleutnant Rudolf Premauer and had a crew complement of 59.

Design
German Type IXC/40 submarines were slightly larger than the original Type IXCs. U-857 had a displacement of  when at the surface and  while submerged. She had two shafts and two  propellers.

U-857 was fitted with six  torpedo tubes (four fitted at the bow and two at the stern), 22 torpedoes, one  SK C/32 naval gun, 180 rounds, and a  Flak M42 as well as two twin  C/30 anti-aircraft guns. The boat had a complement of forty-eight.

Service history

She undertook three patrols, the first was for training. She sank  on 14 April 1945,  on 18 April 1945 and damaged  on 23 April 1945.

Fate
U-857 went missing since 30 April 1945 in the North Atlantic Ocean off the east coast of the United States. All hands were lost, and no wreckage was found.

However more recent commentary surmised that Gustafson had not hit her, and her loss is currently unexplained. U-857 was considered as a possible identity for the wreck that was ultimately determined to be U-869.

Summary of raiding history

References

Bibliography

External links

Ship Wreck Data
Reference from This Day in Naval History. Retrieved 5 December 2019.

German Type IX submarines
U-boats commissioned in 1943
1943 ships
World War II submarines of Germany
Ships built in Bremen (state)
U-boats sunk in 1945
Missing U-boats of World War II
World War II shipwrecks in the Atlantic Ocean
Shipwrecks of the Massachusetts coast
Ships lost with all hands
Maritime incidents in April 1945